Tellurium tetrabromide (TeBr4) is an inorganic chemical compound. It has a similar tetrameric structure to TeCl4.  It can be made by reacting bromine and tellurium. In the vapour TeBr4 dissociates:
TeBr4 → TeBr2 + Br2
It is a conductor when molten, dissociating into the ions TeBr3+ and Br−. When dissolved in benzene and toluene, TeBr4 is present as the unionized tetramer Te4Br16. In solvents with donor properties such as acetonitrile, CH3CN ionic complexes are formed which make the solution conducting:
TeBr4 + 2CH3CN → (CH3CN)2TeBr3+ + Br−

References

Bromides
Tellurium halides
Tellurium(IV) compounds
Chalcohalides